This is a list of electoral results for the electoral district of North West Central in Western Australian state elections.

Members

Election results

Elections in the 2020s

Elections in the 2010s

Elections in the 2000s

References

Western Australian state electoral results by district